Calamphoreus inflatus is the only species of the flowering plant genus Calamphoreus in the family Scrophulariaceae. It is a shrub, formerly known as Eremophila inflata but unlike eremophilas, this species has twisted stamens and an urn-shaped petal tube which remains attached to the fruits after flowering.

Description 

There are 5 oblong sepals which are hairy, and after flowering develop a network of distinct veins. There are also 5 petals joined at their bases, forming an expanded bell-shaped tube. The petal tube is purple except inside the tube where it is white, spotted with purple. There are 4 short stamens with twisted or curved filaments.

Taxonomy and naming
Calamphoreus inflatus was first formally described in 1942 by Charles Gardner in Journal of the Royal Society of Western Australia as Eremophila inflata from a specimen collected in the Coolgardie district near Mount Holland and Lake Cronin. The genus name (Calamphoreus) is from the Ancient Greek words kalos meaning "beautiful" and amphoreus meaning "two-handled vase", "pitcher", "jar", "jug" or "cinerary urn" referring to the shape of the flowers. The specific epithet (inflatus) is a Latin word meaning "puffed up" or "swollen".

Distribution and habitat
Calamphoreus inflatus occurs from Lake King to Mount Holland and in nearby areas in the Coolgardie and Mallee biogeographic regions. It has also been recorded east of Hyden.  It grows in gravelly loam on flats and disturbed sites.

Conservation
Calamphoreus inflatus is classified as "Priority Four"  by the Government of Western Australia Department of Parks and Wildlife meaning that it is rare or near threatened.

Use in horticulture
Commonly cultivated as Eremophila inflata, this species grows well in most soils provided it is well drained and in a sunny position. It is most easily propagated from cuttings.

References 

Scrophulariaceae
Monotypic Lamiales genera
Scrophulariaceae genera
Endemic flora of Southwest Australia
Plants described in 1942
Taxa named by Charles Gardner